The 1961–62 Israel State Cup (Gvia HaMedina) was the 23rd season of Israel's nationwide football cup competition and the eighth after the Israeli Declaration of Independence.

The competition began on 12 February 1961, less than two weeks after the conclusion of the previous competition. Despite this, the competition took slightly less than 15 months to complete, partly due to Israel's involvement in the 1962 FIFA World Cup qualification and its matches against Italy in late 1961.

The IFA sought to play the final on Tu Bishvat, 15 February 1962, with the President presenting the cup, as the previous final was played. However, as the holiday was celebrated on a Saturday, The final was set to 28 February 1962. However, as Maccabi Haifa already committed to a friendly match against Altay S.K. the day before the set date, the match had to be rescheduled. The final was therefore held on 27 March 1962 at Ramat Gan Stadium between Maccabi Haifa and Maccabi Tel Aviv and ended goalless.

The replay was played, at the request of President Itzhak Ben-Zvi, at the Hebrew University Stadium. The date was set to 7 May 1962 and Maccabi Haifa won 5–2 to win its first cup.

Results

Fourth Round
Matches were played on 29 April 1961.

Byes: Hakoah Tel Aviv, Hapoel Mahane Yehuda, Hapoel Tiberias.

Replay

Fifth Round
Liga Leumit teams entered the competition at this round. Matches were played on 20 May 1961. The match between Hapoel Marmorek and Maccabi Tel Aviv was played on 17 May 1961.

Replay

Sixth Round
Resuming the competition after the summer break and Israel's matches against Italy, most matches were played on 2 December 1961, with the matches between lower leagues' teams Postponed to 12 December 1961.

The match between Maccabi Haifa and Maccabi Netanya ended with a result of 3–1, however, as Maccabi Haifa fielded an ineligible player (Israel Pinkas), the match was given to Maccabi Netanya. However, on an appeal the decision was reversed and the original score confirmed.

Replay

Second Replay

Quarter-finals

Semi-finals

Final

Replay

References
100 Years of Football 1906-2006, Elisha Shohat (Israel), 2006
State Cup games Davar, 28.4.1961, Historical Jewish Press 
State Cup (Page 3) Hadshot HaSport, 30.4.1961, archive.football.co.il 
 All the matches in the State Cup Elisha Shohat, HaMakhtesh

External links
 Israel Football Association website

Israel State Cup
State Cup
State Cup
Israel State Cup seasons